Inside the Pleasuredome is an "Ultra-Deluxe box set" released by ZTT Records and Union Square Music in October 2014 to commemorate the 30th anniversary of Frankie Goes To Hollywood's debut album, "Welcome to the Pleasuredome". Spread across a double album on 180g vinyl, three 10" singles, a cassingle, a 5 track download-only instrumental EP and a DVD, the boxset contains 20 previously unreleased mixes of tracks from the Pleasuredome album.

Limited to 2000 boxes, it was released exclusively through the Pledgemusic.com website.

The boxset comprised 10 elements, as well as downloads of all non-5.1 audio in FLAC and MP3 formats.

Track listing

"Welcome to the Pleasuredome" – 2014 12" Vinyl Edition

 "Well...." 0:55
 "The World Is My Oyster"	1:02
 "Snatch of Fury (Stay)"	0:36
 "Welcome to the Pleasure Dome"	12:58
 "Relax (Come Fighting)"	3:56
 "War (.... And Hide)"	6:12
 "Two Tribes (For The Victims of Ravishment)"	3:23
 "Ferry (Go)"	1:49
 "Born to Run"	3:56
 "San Jose (The Way)"	3:09
 "Wish (The Lads Were Here)"	2:48
 "Including The Ballad of 32"	4:47
 "Krisco Kisses"	2:57
 "Black Night White Light"	4:05
 "The Only Star in Heaven"	4:16
 "The Power of Love"	5:28
 "Bang"	1:08

"Lovers and Haters" – Studio Sessions

 "Relax" (04.09.83: Rough Mix) – 4:09 *
 "Relax" (10.09.83: CMI Backing Track) – 3:13 *
 "The Only Star in Heaven" (29.08.84: 'Gary's Mix' with Keys and BD) – 3:27 *
 "The Only Star in Heaven" (29.08.84: 'Gary's Mix' Dub Bits) – 2:22 *
* previously unreleased

"Cowboys and Indians" – Alternate Takes

 "Two Tribes" (04.10.84: Bit 4) – 0:29 *
 "War" (04.10.84: Man Has a Sense for the Discovery of Beauty) – 8:35 *
 "Two Tribes" (31.05.84: Rough 12" Mix) – 4:27 *
 "Two Tribes" (01:06:84: Rough 12" Mix) – 6:32 *
* previously unreleased

"Doctors and Nurses" – Mix/Remix

 "War" (17.05.84: 'War! III') – 10:19 *
 "Welcome to the Pleasuredome" (10.08.84: 'Pleasuredome II') – 9:44 *
* previously unreleased

Relax (Suck It Up, Soap It Up): The Relax Cassette (C90 singlette)

Suck It Up 
 "Relax" (Bit 1) – 0:54 *
 "Relax" (Sex Mix) – 16:24
 "Relax" (New York Mix) – 7:25
 "Relax" (Greatest Bits)	 – 16:49
 "One September Monday" (Bit 1) – 1:43 *

Soap It Up 
 "Relax" (Bit 2) – 1:10 *
 "Relax" (Sex Mix, Edition 2) – 8:24
 "Relax" (Sex Mix, Edition 3) – 8:10
 "Relax" (Video Version) – 4:23 *
 "One September Monday" (Bit 2) – 0:42 *
 "Relax" (Greek Disco Mix) – 6:16
 "Relax" (The Last Seven Inches!) – 3:33
 "Relax" (Bonus, Again) – 4:34
 "Relax" (Bit 3) – 0:44 *
* previously unreleased

"Brothers and Sisters" (DVD)

"Frankie at Play – Frankie in Motion (Stereo Videos)"
 "Ferry Cross the Mersey" (Voiceless) – 1:25
 "Relax" (Version 1) – 4:09
 "Relax" (Live Version) – 4:21
 "Relax" (Laser Version)	 – 3:55
 "Two Tribes" (Version 1) – 4:11
 "Two Tribes" (Video Destructo) – 6:21	
 "The Power of Love" (Version 1) – 5:01
 "The Power of Love" (Version 2) – 5:05
 "Welcome to the Pleasuredome" (An Alternative To Reality) – 7:52
 "Welcome to the Pleasuredome" (The Escape Act) – 5:47
 "Relax" – No 1 and Guiltless (Version 1) – 0:33
 "Relax" – No 1 and Guiltless (Version 2) – 0:33
 "The Power of Love" (Win Hearts And Minds) – 0:32
 "Welcome to the Pleasuredome" (The Event of the Decade) – 0:43

"Frankie at 5.1 – Frankie in 5.1 (Multi-channel Audio)"
 "San Jose" (Voiceless) – 1:20 
 "Relax" (5.1 Mix) – 4:02
 "Two Tribes" (5.1 Mix) – 3:25
 "Ferry Cross The Mersey" (5.1 Mix) – 4:07
 "The World Is My Oyster" (5.1 Mix) – 2:00	
 "Welcome to the Pleasuredome" (5.1 Mix) – 13:43
 "San Jose" (5.1 Mix) – 3:11
 "War" (5.1 Mix) – 4:21
 "Born to Run" (5.1 Mix) – 4:00
 "The Power of Love" (5.1 Mix) – 5:41

"Voiceless, Volume 1" (Digital EP)

 "Welcome to the Pleasuredome" (A Remade World, Voiceless) – 5:02 *
 "War" (Hide Yourself!, Voiceless) – 4:14 *
 "Two Tribes" (Carnage 7", Voiceless) – 3:21 *
 "Relax" (Come Fighting, Voiceless) – 3:55 *
 "The Power of Love" (Voiceless) – 5:28
* previously unreleased

References

Frankie Goes to Hollywood albums
2014 albums